The Progress is a Russian expendable cargo spacecraft. Its purpose is to deliver the supplies needed to sustain a human presence in orbit. While it does not carry a crew, it can be boarded by astronauts when docked to a space station, hence it is classified as crewed by its manufacturer. Progress is derived from the crewed Soyuz spacecraft and launches on the same launch vehicle, a Soyuz rocket.

Progress has supported space stations as early as Salyut 6 and as recently as the International Space Station (ISS). Each year there are between three and four Progress flights to the ISS. A Progress remains docked until shortly before being replaced with a new one or a Soyuz (which will use the same docking port). Then it is filled with waste, disconnected, and de-orbited, at which point it burns up in the atmosphere. Due to the variation in Progress vehicles flown to the ISS, NASA uses its own nomenclature where "ISS 1P" means the first Progress spacecraft to ISS.

Progress was developed because of the need for a constant source of supplies to make long duration space missions possible. It was determined that cosmonauts needed an inflow of consumables (food, water, air, etc.), plus there was a need for maintenance items and scientific payloads that necessitated a dedicated cargo carrier. Such payloads were impractical to launch with passengers in the restricted space of a Soyuz. As of 15 February 2021, there have been 168 Progress flights with three failures. All three failures have occurred between 2011 and 2016.

Design 
Progress is of much the same size and shape as Soyuz. It consists of three modules:

 A pressurized forward module. This carries the supplies for the crew such as scientific equipment, clothes, prepackaged and fresh food, and letters from home. The docking drogue is similar to that of the Soyuz but features ducting for the Unsymmetrical dimethylhydrazine (UDMH) fuel and N2O4 oxidiser.
 A fuel compartment. The reentry module of the Soyuz was replaced with an unpressurized propellant and refueling compartment with ducting along the outside of the spacecraft. This meant that if a leak occurred, the poisonous gas would not enter the station's atmosphere. The fuel is carried in two tanks.
 A propulsion module. The propulsion module, at the rear of the spacecraft, remained unchanged from the Soyuz and contains the orientation engines used for the automatic docking. It may be used to boost the orbit of the station once docked.

Reduction in mass was possible because the Progress was designed to be uncrewed and disposable. This means that there is no need for bulky life support systems and heat shields. A small amount of weight is saved due to the lack of automatic crew rescue systems and the lack of parachutes. The spacecraft also has no ability to split into separate modules. After undocking, the spacecraft performs a retrofire and burns up in the atmosphere.

Versions 
There were many small variations between the different flights, but the major upgrades are reflected in the change of name.

Progress (1978–1990) 

There were 42 spacecraft built using the initial Progress design, the last one being launched in May 1990.

The bureau in charge of designing the freighter was TsKBEM (now RKK Energia). They began work on the design in mid-1973, assigning Progress the GRAU index 11F615A15. The design was complete by February 1974, and the first production model was ready for launch in November 1977. Progress 1 launched on 20 January 1978 aboard the same rocket used to launch the Soyuz. It still featured the same launch shroud as the Soyuz, though this was purely for aerodynamic purposes as the launch escape system had been deactivated.

The autonomous flight time was 3 days, the same time as that of the Soyuz ferry. It could spend 30 days docked. Progress always docked to the aft port of the station it was resupplying (the aft being where the main rocket engines of the station and their tankage, for refueling by the Progress, are located).

 Launch mass: 
 Mass of cargo:
 ~ (before Progress-24)
 ~ (from Progress-24)
 Length: 
 Diameter of cargo modules: 
 Maximum diameter: 
 Volume of cargo compartment:

Progress-M 11F615A55 (1989–2021) 

The upgraded Progress M (GRAU: 11F615A55, manufacturer's designation: 7K-TGM) was first launched in August 1989. The first 43 flights all went to Mir; following Mir's re-entry, Progress was used as the resupply vehicle for the International Space Station. As of December 2020, there have been over 80 flights (over different configurations) to the ISS and more are scheduled.

The Progress M is essentially the same spacecraft as the Progress, but it features improvements based on the Soyuz-T and Soyuz-TM designs. It can spend up to 30 days in autonomous flight and is able to carry  more. Also, unlike the old Progress crafts, it can return items to Earth. Progress M can also dock to the forward port of the station and still transfer fuel. It uses the same rendezvous system as the Soyuz, and it features solar panels for the first time. The last launch was of Progress M-UM on 24 November 2021.

 Launch mass: 
 Cargo mass: 
 Dry cargo mass: 
 Liquid cargo mass: 
 Length: 
 Diameter of cargo modules: 
 Maximum diameter: 
 Dry cargo compartment volume: 
 Solar array span:

Progress-М 11F615A60 (2008–2015) 

A new modification of the Progress spacecraft, with new TsVM-101 digital flight computer and MBITS digital telemetry system, was first launched on 26 November 2008, at 12:38 UTC from the Kazakhstan's Baikonur Cosmodrome spaceport aboard a Russian Soyuz rocket. The first spacecraft of this series was Progress M-01M.

The spacecraft belongs to the so-called 400 series (GRAU: 11F615A60), and all modifications applied to it were subsequently used in the production of new Soyuz TMA-01M crewed spacecraft.

Progress M-27M was launched on 28 April 2015, but communication with the vessel was lost soon after, and it was destroyed as it re-entered the atmosphere on 8 May 2015. The last launch was Progress M-29M.

Progress M1 (2000–2004) 

Progress M1 is another variant, capable of carrying more propellant (but less total cargo) to the space station. There have been 11 of these flights.

 Mass: 
 Capacity cargo: 
 Capacity dry cargo: 
 Capacity propellant:

Progress M2 
Progress M2 was a planned variant, which was a proposed design for the proposed Mir-2 space station, but was dropped due to financial issues. The M2 variant would have a larger service module for larger cargo or space station modules and would have been launched on a Zenit rocket as the spacecraft is bigger.

Progress MS (2015–present) 

Progress MS is an improved variant which first launched on 21 December 2015. It has the following improvements:

 New external compartment that enables it to deploy satellites. Each compartment can hold up to four launch containers. First time installed on Progress MS-03.
 Enhanced redundancy thanks to the addition of a backup system of electrical motors for the docking and sealing mechanism.
 Improved Micrometeoroid (MMOD) protection with additional panels in the cargo compartment.
 Luch Russian relay satellites link capabilities enable telemetry and control even when not in direct view of ground radio stations.
 GNSS autonomous navigation enables real time determination of the status vector and orbital parameters dispensing with the need of ground station orbit determination.
 Real time relative navigation thanks to direct radio data exchange capabilities with the space station.
 New digital radio that enables enhanced TV camera view for the docking operations.
 The Ukrainian Chezara Kvant-V on board radio system and antenna/feeder system has been replaced with a Unified Command Telemetry System (UCTS).
 Replacement of the Kurs A with Kurs NA digital system.

Current status 
Progress spacecraft are used to resupply the International Space Station (ISS) as of 2021. Between 1 February 2003 and 26 July 2005, they were the only spacecraft available to transport large quantities of supplies to the station, as the Space Shuttle fleet was grounded after the breakup of Columbia at the end of STS-107. For ISS missions, the Progress M1 variant is used, which moves the water tanks from the propellant and refueling module to the pressurized section, and as a result is able to carry more propellant. Progress M-UM, the final flight of a Progress-M spacecraft, was launched 24 November 2021 on a Soyuz 2.1b. As of 7/1/2021, there have been 170 Progress flights to the ISS.

It delivered food, fuel and supplies, including 705 kg of propellant,  of oxygen and air,  of water.

The European Space Agency (ESA) operated its own type of robotic supply freighter, the Automated Transfer Vehicle (ATV). The first of these, named Jules Verne, was launched at 04:03 UTC on 9 March 2008. ATVs can carry up to 8.85 tonnes of cargo into space, roughly three times as much as the Progress, and were launched annually by Ariane 5 rockets from 2011-2014 as part of ESA contribution to ISS upkeep. The design is adopted as the Service Module of the Orion spacecraft.

NASA's planned Orion spacecraft was initially designed to have an uncrewed variant of the Crew module similar to Progress; however, this capability was removed in 2009. SpaceX's commercial Dragon spacecraft and Northrop Grumman's Cygnus spacecraft also handle American logistics to the International Space Station.

See also 
 List of Progress flights
 Uncrewed spaceflights to the International Space Station
 Comparison of space station cargo vehicles
 
 
 
 
 
 Orbital Technologies Commercial Space Station

Notes

References

External links 

 Russian Progress Spacecraft — NASA page discussing the Progress spacecraft, updated May 2005
 Progress cargo ship—History, photos and details at RussianSpaceWeb.com

 
Cargo spacecraft
Crewed space program of Russia
Crewed space program of the Soviet Union
Supply vehicles for the International Space Station